Eight ships and a shore establishment of the Royal Navy have been named HMS Centurion, after the centurions of ancient Rome. A ninth ship was planned but never built.
Ships
  was a 34-gun ship launched in 1650 and wrecked in 1689.
  was a 48-gun fourth-rate launched in 1691 and broken up in 1728.
  was a 60-gun fourth-rate launched in 1732 and broken up 1769.
  was a 50-gun fourth-rate launched in 1774. She was reduced to harbour service in 1809, sank at her moorings in 1824, and was raised and broken up in 1825.
She was renamed HMS Centurion in 1826 and was broken up in 1828.
  was an 80-gun third-rate launched in 1844. She was converted to screw propulsion in 1855, and sold in 1870.
  was a Centurion-class battleship launched in 1892 and sold in 1910.
  was a King George V-class battleship launched in 1911. She was converted to a target ship in 1926, rated as an escort ship in 1940, and was sunk off Arromanches as a breakwater in 1944.
 HMS Centurion was to have been a 9,000 ton cruiser, planned in 1945, but cancelled in 1946.

Shore establishment
  was the central drafting depot established at Haslemere in 1956, commissioned in 1957 and named in 1964. The base moved to Gosport, becoming a drafting depot and a pay and accounting centre, in 1970.

Battle honours
Ships named Centurion have earned the following battle honours:

Armada, 1588
Cadiz, 1596
Dover, 1652
Portland, 1653
Gabbard, 1653
Scheveningen, 1653
Santa Cruz, 1657
Lowestoft, 1665
Four Days' Battle, 1666
Orfordness, 1666
Barfleur, 1692
Velez Malaga, 1704
Marbella, 1705
Nuestra Senora de Covadonga, 1743
Finisterre, 1747
Louisbourg, 1758
Quebec, 1759
Havana, 1762
St. Lucia, 1778
China, 1900
Jutland, 1916
Normandy, 1944

Royal Navy ship names